Jago may refer to:

People
 Jago, an alternate spelling for Iago
 Jago (name), a Cornish name
 Jago (illustrator) (born 1979), book illustrator
 Jago of Britain, a legendary king of the Britons
 Fred W. P. Jago (fl. 1838–1892), scholar of the Cornish language
 F. V. Jago (1780–1846), English antiquary and oriental traveller, later styled Francis Vyvyan Jago Arundell
 Jago Cooper (born 1977), English archaeologist
 Nick Jago (born 1977), English musician; drummer of the American rock band Black Rebel Motorcycle Club
 Richard Jago (1715–1781), English poet
 Henry Gordon Jago, a Doctor Who character

Geography
 Jago, a port and town on the Indonesian island of Singkep, Riau Islands Province
 Jago Bay, Northwest Territories, Canada
 Jago, County Kildare, a former civil parish in County Kildare, Republic of Ireland
 Santiago, Cape Verde, an island also called "St. Iago" or "St. Jago"
 Jago River, a river in Alaska

Other
 Jago (Killer Instinct), a playable character from the video game Killer Instinct
 Jago, a character in C. J. Cherryh's Foreigner series
 Jago, a 1991 novel by Kim Newman
 Jago Temple, a Hindu temple in Tumpang, Malang Regency, East Java, Indonesia
 Jago (car), a British kit-car maker
 JAGO (German research submersible), a crewed research submersible
 Jago or preman, a type of strongman (often romanticized) in the social and political history of Indonesia

See also